Labulla is a genus of dwarf spiders that was first described by Eugène Louis Simon in 1884.  it contains only three species, found in France, Portugal, and Spain: L. flahaulti, L. machadoi, and L. thoracica.

See also
 List of Linyphiidae species (I–P)

References

Araneomorphae genera
Linyphiidae
Spiders of Europe